Dato' Wan Aishah binti Wan Ariffin (Jawi: وان عائشة بنت وان عارفين; born 3 January 1965), known monomously as Aishah, is a singer, actress, and politician from Negeri Sembilan, Malaysia.

Music career 
Aishah first achieved stardom in New Zealand when her first album with her band Aishah and The Fan Club, Sensation, has raised its name as Malaysia's first successful female singer to the international stage and has even had an entry into the Billboard Hot 100 chart with the song "Don't Let Me Fall Alone" in 1990. She joined the pop rock band while she was studying in New Zealand in the 1980s. After she was no longer with the Fan Club, Aishah returned to Malaysia while she was singing solo so she was appointed as one of the country's pop legendaries with a row of hit songs and best-selling albums. Aishah released 11 solo albums after leaving the Fan Club.

In 2010, Aishah made a comeback with stage shows and an album. Her songs and style of music changed from R&B to nasheed spiritual songs.

She re-entered the Malaysian music industry when she contested and became champion in the reality show singing competition organised by Astro, Gegar Vaganza Season 4 in 2017 which were open to artists from the 1980s to 2000's era.

Political career
In 2011, she involved in politics by joining Pan-Malaysian Islamic Party (PAS) and contested for the parliamentary seat in Jempol, Negeri Sembilan in the 2013 Malaysian general election, which she lost to Barisan Nasional (BN) candidate, former Menteri Besar Mohd Isa Abdul Samad with a majority of 8629 votes. Later she joined the PAS splinter but progressive new party, National Trust Party (AMANAH) after its inception in 2015, a component of Pakatan Harapan (PH) coalition.

Election results

Honours 
  :
  Knight of the Order of Loyal Service to Negeri Sembilan (DBNS) – Dato' (2022)

See also
 Music of Malaysia
 Malaysian pop

References

Living people
1965 births
People from Negeri Sembilan
Malaysian people of Malay descent
Malaysian Muslims
Malaysian women pop singers
Malaysian pop rock singers
Malaysian rhythm and blues singers
Malaysian television personalities
Malaysian actor-politicians
English-language singers from Malaysia
Malay-language singers
Performers of Islamic music
Awakening Music artists
Former Malaysian Islamic Party politicians
National Trust Party (Malaysia) politicians
21st-century Malaysian women singers
Malaysian film actresses
Malaysian television actresses